Brigadier-General George Earl Maney (August 24, 1826 – February 9, 1901) was an American soldier, politician, railroad executive and diplomat. He was a general in the Confederate States Army during the American Civil War and a postbellum U.S. ambassador to Colombia, Bolivia, Uruguay, and Paraguay.

Early life and education
George Earl Maney was born in Franklin, Tennessee, to Judge Thomas Maney and his wife.  His father was a prominent newspaper editor and circuit judge. Young Maney attended the Nashville Seminary before graduating from the University of Nashville in 1845 at the age of 19.

Mexican-American War
Maney served as a second lieutenant in the 1st Tennessee Volunteer Regiment during the Mexican-American War (1846–1848). When his three-months term of enlistment expired, he enrolled in the United States Army and served as a first lieutenant in the 3rd U.S. Dragoons, which participated in General Winfield Scott's march to Mexico City.

Antebellum career
When hostilities ceased, Maney returned home. He studied law, passed his bar exam in 1850, and established a law practice in Franklin. It became quite successful. Maney subsequently entered politics and was elected to the Tennessee State Legislature.

American Civil War
Following the secession of Tennessee and the beginning of the American Civil War, Maney joined the Rock City Guards, a Nashville militia. He subsequently enlisted in the Confederate States Army as a captain in the 11th Tennessee Volunteer Infantry. On May 6, 1861, he was promoted to colonel of the 1st Tennessee. He served in western Virginia, first under Robert E. Lee at the Battle of Cheat Mountain and later under Thomas J. "Stonewall" Jackson at Bath and Romney.

Maney asked for a reassignment to his native Tennessee, which was threatened by Union forces. As an officer in the Army of Tennessee, Maney participated in the Battle of Shiloh and was promoted on April 16, 1862, to brigadier general. He led his brigade in the battles of Perryville, Chickamauga, and Murfreesboro. In November 1863, he was wounded severely in his arm during the Chattanooga Campaign. He was on medical leave for much of the rest of the year.

In 1864, Maney commanded a division in William J. Hardee's corps during the Atlanta Campaign. He was captured in August and later released, but he did not return to active field duty because of problems with his wounded arm. Hardee recommended that Maney be promoted to major general, but the request was not fulfilled. Maney surrendered following the Carolinas Campaign and was paroled on May 1, 1865, at Greensboro, North Carolina.

Postbellum career
After the war, Maney returned to his Tennessee home. He became president of the Tennessee and Pacific Railroad in 1868, serving in that executive post for nine years. Unlike many of his former Confederate compatriots, he became an active Republican. He was elected to the state senate. During the carpetbagger era, Maney held considerable influence over the Governor of Tennessee, Dewitt Clinton Senter. Maney helped restore the government to former Confederates once their civil rights were restored.

Maney became active in a number of reconciliation efforts during Reconstruction, working to improve relations between the former enemies. In early 1876, he was a candidate for governor, but withdrew his name from the ballot. In December of that year, his daughter Frances married a former Union officer in the 15th Massachusetts.

During the presidential administrations of James A. Garfield, Chester Arthur, and Benjamin Harrison, Maney was appointed as ambassador to various countries in South America. He was the U.S. minister to Colombia (1881–1882), and then was the Minister Resident/Consul General to Bolivia from November 4, 1882, until June 1, 1883. He returned home and was a delegate to the Republican National Conventions of 1884 and 1888. He spent four years (1890–1894) as the U.S. ambassador to Uruguay and Paraguay.

General George Maney died in Washington, D.C., from a cerebral hemorrhage. He is buried in Mount Olivet Cemetery in Nashville, Tennessee.

Personal life
Maney married Elizabeth T. "Betty" Crutcher of Nashville in 1853; they raised a family of five children.

See also

List of American Civil War generals (Confederate)

Notes

References
 Eicher, John H., and David J. Eicher, Civil War High Commands. Stanford: Stanford University Press, 2001. .
 Sifakis, Stewart. Who Was Who in the Civil War. New York: Facts On File, 1988. .
 Warner, Ezra J. Generals in Gray: Lives of the Confederate Commanders. Baton Rouge: Louisiana State University Press, 1959. .
 Warner, Seth, "George Earl Maney: Soldier, Railroader, and Diplomat," Tennessee Historical Quarterly, Vol. LXV (2006), 130-147.
 Welsh, Jack D., Medical Histories of Confederate Generals. Kent, Ohio: Kent State University, 1995. .
 Winborne, Benjamin Brodie, The Colonial and State Political History of Hereford County, N.C., Murfreesboro, North Carolina: Edwards & Broughton, 1906.

Further reading
 Hewitt, Lawrence L. (edited by William C. Davis), "George Earl Maney," The Confederate General, Vol. 4. Harrisburg, Pennsylvania: 1991.
 Sanders, Stuart W., "Maney's Confederate Brigage at the Battle of Perryville", The History Press, Charleston, SC, 2014

External links
 
 American National Biography

1826 births
1901 deaths
People from Franklin, Tennessee
Confederate States Army generals
People of Tennessee in the American Civil War
American military personnel of the Mexican–American War
19th-century American railroad executives
Ambassadors of the United States to Bolivia
Ambassadors of the United States to Colombia
Ambassadors of the United States to Paraguay
Republican Party Tennessee state senators
Ambassadors of the United States to Uruguay
19th-century American diplomats
Burials at Mount Olivet Cemetery (Nashville)
19th-century American politicians